The 2021 Archery World Cup, also known as the Hyundai Archery World Cup for sponsorship reasons, is the 15th edition of the international archery circuit organised annually by World Archery. The 2021 World Cup consisted of four events, and ran from 19 April to 30 September 2021.

Calendar
The calendar for the 2021 World Cup, announced by World Archery.

Results

Recurve

Men's individual

Women's individual

Men's team

Women's team

Mixed team

Compound

Men's individual

Women's individual

Men's team

Women's team

Mixed team

Medals table

References

External links
 World Archery website

Archery World Cup
World Cup
International sports competitions hosted by Guatemala
International archery competitions hosted by Switzerland
International archery competitions hosted by France
International archery competitions hosted by the United States